Helicobacter pullorum is a bacterium in the Helicobacteraceae family, Campylobacterales order. It was isolated from the liver, duodenum, and caecum of broiler and layer chickens, and from humans with gastroenteritis. It is a nongastric urease-negative Helicobacter species colonizing the lower bowel.

References

Further reading

External links
Broad Institute entry
Type strain of Helicobacter pullorum at BacDive -  the Bacterial Diversity Metadatabase

Campylobacterota
Bacteria described in 1994